Perillus splendidus is a species of predatory stink bug in the family Pentatomidae. It is found in Central America and North America.

References

Asopinae
Articles created by Qbugbot
Insects described in 1861